André Wiederkehr (born 20 April 1970) is a retired Swiss football midfielder.

References

1970 births
Living people
Swiss men's footballers
Swiss Super League players
Grasshopper Club Zürich players
FC Lausanne-Sport players
Neuchâtel Xamax FCS players
FC Aarau players
FC Zürich players
FC Luzern players
FC Wil players
Association football midfielders